Bruce Bauman is an American writer. He is the author of the novels Broken Sleep (2015) and And The Word Was (2006). His work has appeared in the Los Angeles Times, Salon, BOMB, Bookforum, Dart International Magazine, and Black Clock. He has previously been awarded the City of Los Angeles Award in literature (2008-2009), a Durfee Foundation grant, and an UNESCO/Aschberg award.

Career
Bauman formerly taught in CalArts's MFA Creative Writing Program and School of Critical Studies. He served as the senior editor for the literary magazine Black Clock for 13 years, from its inception to its end in 2016.

Personal life
Born in Brooklyn and raised in Flushing, Queens, Bauman currently lives in Los Angeles with his wife, the painter Suzan Woodruff.

Bibliography 
Novels
 And The Word Was (2006)
 Broken Sleep (2015)

Short stories
The Newly Born Woman
Lilith in Wunderland 
Angel, Heaven, Yesterday
Day Time  

Essays
Television at CBGB   

Articles
Stewart Wallace & Michael Korie's Harvey Milk   
Amnesia   
Fiscal Cliff Notes From a Long-Suffering Lefty
Bruce Bauman's Guide to Books and Booze 
On The Random Discovery of Life-Changing Books
The Non-Champions Hall of Fame
Old Songs for the New Resistance

Art Reviews
Anders A at Highways Performance Space
Victor Ekpuk at 18th Street Arts Complex
Rev. Ethan Acres at Patricia Faure
Anita Dubeat Patricia Correia
Shirin Neshat at Patrick Painter
Donald Moffett & Sister Corita at UCLA Hammer
J.S.G. Boggs at Frumkin/Duval
Rev. Ethan Acres at Patricia Faure
Anita Dubeat Patricia Correia
Shirin Neshat at Patrick Painter
Off the Hook at S.K. Gallery
Michal Rovner at Shoshana Wayne
Don Giffin at Christopher Grimes
The Empty Deep. Gerhard Richter at the MoMA
Exit/Salida
The Art of War
The Life Lessons of Don Giffen
Beuys Will Be Beuys

Interviews
The Critic in Winter

References

External links
Official website
PopMatters review of Broken Sleep
Shelf Awareness review of Broken Sleep
LARB interview with Bauman
LA Weekly review of And The Word Was
Bookworm interview with Bauman
Full Stop interview with Bauman
Entropy interview with Bauman

Year of birth missing (living people)
Living people
21st-century American novelists